Ĥ or ĥ is a letter of some extended Latin alphabets, most prominently a consonant in Esperanto orthography, where it represents a voiceless velar fricative  or voiceless uvular fricative .

It is also used in the revised Demers/Blanchet/St Onge orthography for Chinook Jargon.

In the case of the minuscule, some fonts place the circumflex centered above the entire base letter h, others over the riser of the letter, and others over the shoulder.

{|
|
|-
|ĥ in the fonts Code2000, Sylfaen, Pragmatica Esperanto
|}

History 

"Ĥ" was created by adding a circumflex to an ordinary "H". It first appeared as part of the alphabet of the international language Esperanto, with the publication of the Unua Libro on 26 July 1887 marking the beginning of its wider usage. Like all other non-basic Latin letters in the Esperanto alphabet, it was inspired by Western Slavic Latin alphabets (e.g. Czech), but uses a circumflex instead of a caron — most likely to make the orthography appear more international (i.e. less Slavic) and more compatible with French typewriters, which were in general use at the time and had a dead key for the circumflex, allowing it to be typed over any character.

Reported demise 
⟨Ĥ⟩ was always the least frequent letter in Esperanto orthography, occurring mostly in words with Greek etymologies, where it represented a Romanized chi (in fact its name in the Kalocsay abecedary, was most likely inspired by this usage). Since chi is pronounced  in most languages, neologistic equivalents soon appeared in which ⟨ĥ⟩ was replaced by ⟨k⟩, such as →  ("technology") and →  ("chemistry"). Some other replacements followed different patterns, such as →  ("Chinese ").

These additions and replacements came very early and were in general use by World War I. Since then, the imminent demise of ⟨ĥ⟩ has been often discussed, but has never really happened. Some words originally containing a ⟨ĥ⟩ are preferred to existing replacements (old or new), such as  vs.  ("chaos").

Several words commonly use ⟨ĥ⟩, particularly those not derived from Greek words ( ("khan"),  ("jota"),  ("Liechtenstein"), etc.) or those in which there is another word that uses "k" in that context. The latter include:
 ("echo") ≠  ("beginning")
 ("Czech") ≠  ("bank check")
 ("chorus") ≠  ("heart") ≠  ("hour")

Other uses

 A 'Ĥ' was used in the stage name of the 1980s Italo disco singer CĤATO.

Computing codes

See also
 Ĉ, Ĝ, Ĵ, Ŝ, Ŭ – the other non-basic Latin letters of the Esperanto alphabet
 Ħ

Notes

References

Esperanto letters with diacritics
Latin letters with diacritics